Chloe-Lesleigh Tryon (born 25 January 1994) is a South African cricketer. She has appeared for South Africa in all formats of the game.

Career
On her debut for South Africa, a Twenty20 International against West Indies in the 2010 Women's World Twenty20, she claimed two wickets in her first over, one with her first delivery, becoming the first cricketer to take a wicket with the first ball of her career in WT20I history. She along with Suné Luus set the record for the highest ever 6th wicket partnership in the history of WODI (142 runs).

In March 2018, she was one of fourteen players to be awarded a national contract by Cricket South Africa ahead of the 2018–19 season. In October 2018, she was named in South Africa's squad for the 2018 ICC Women's World Twenty20 tournament in the West Indies. Ahead of the tournament, she was named as one of the players to watch. She played in her 50th WT20I for South Africa during the group stage of the tournament.

In September 2019, she was named in the Terblanche XI squad for the inaugural edition of the Women's T20 Super League in South Africa. In January 2020, she was named as the vice-captain of South Africa's squad for the 2020 ICC Women's T20 World Cup in Australia. On 23 July 2020, Tyron was named in South Africa's 24-woman squad to begin training in Pretoria, ahead of their tour to England. In July 2021, she was drafted by London Spirit for the inaugural season of The Hundred.

In February 2022, she was named as the vice-captain of South Africa's team for the 2022 Women's Cricket World Cup in New Zealand. In July 2022, she was named in South Africa's team for the cricket tournament at the 2022 Commonwealth Games in Birmingham, England. In August 2022, she was signed as an overseas player for Barbados Royals for the inaugural edition of the Women's Caribbean Premier League.

References

External links
 
 

1994 births
Living people
Cricketers from Durban
Hobart Hurricanes (WBBL) cricketers
KwaZulu-Natal Coastal women cricketers
London Spirit cricketers
Barbados Royals (WCPL) cricketers
Sydney Thunder (WBBL) cricketers
Mumbai Indians (WPL) cricketers
South Africa women One Day International cricketers
South Africa women Test cricketers
South Africa women Twenty20 International cricketers
South African women cricketers
Cricketers at the 2022 Commonwealth Games
Commonwealth Games competitors for South Africa